Psychrophrynella bagrecito is a species of frog in the family Strabomantidae. It is endemic to the Cusco Region, Peru, and found on the Amazonian slopes of the Andes at elevations of  asl.

Description
Psychrophrynella bagrecito are small frogs: adult males measure  and females  in snout–vent length. Skin on dorsum is shagreened, becoming more coarse on the lower back. Dorsum is striped with shades of brown. Venter has areolate skin and is white to cream with some brown mottling. Males have distended vocal sacs.

Habitat and conservation
Species' natural habitat is montane cloud forest. It is threatened by habitat loss caused by small-scale agriculture and firewood collection.

References 

bagrecito
Amphibians of the Andes
Amphibians of Peru
Endemic fauna of Peru
Amphibians described in 1986
Taxa named by John Douglas Lynch
Taxonomy articles created by Polbot